Blade is a 1973 American mystery thriller film directed by Ernest Pintoff and starring John Marley, Jon Cypher, Kathryn Walker, William Prince and Keene Curtis.

Cast
John Marley as Tommy Blade
Jon Cypher as Petersen
Kathryn Walker as Maggie
William Prince as Powers
John Schuck as Reardon
Rue McClanahan as Gail
Morgan Freeman as Chris
Michael McGuire as Quincy
Joe Santos as Spinelli
Ted Lange as Henry Watson
Julius Harris as Card Player
Keene Curtis as Steiner
Marshall Efron as Fat man

Reception
Leonard Maltin awarded the film two and a half stars, describing it as "A bit pretentious and involved; fairly absorbing."

References

External links
 
 

1970s English-language films